Czechoslovakian ČSD Class T 458.1 diesel locomotives remain in use as shunters in both Slovakia and the Czech Republic. They are now classified as class 721.

The locomotives were built using the same hood arrangement and driver's cab as the T 435.0. The 6 S 310 DR diesel engine was also retained. Due to the increased weight of the units, they had a higher tractive effort despite using the same diesel engine. Except for the first five units, the locomotives  had an extended wheelset using swing arms with helical spring suspension, offering improved running characteristics. 

ČSD built the first 13 locomotives to wide gauge standard, then built 206 locomotives between 1963 to 1965 to standard gauge.  The type was also successful in the export market; in addition to the USSR, it was also supplied to Albania, India, Iraq, the GDR and Poland.

See also
List of České dráhy locomotive classes

References

Diesel locomotives of the Czech Republic
ČKD diesel locomotives
Railway locomotives introduced in 1961
Standard gauge locomotives of Czechoslovakia
Standard gauge locomotives of the Czech Republic
Standard gauge locomotives of Slovakia
5 ft gauge locomotives